Billbergia horrida is a plant species in the genus Billbergia. This species is native to Brazil.

Cultivars
 Billbergia 'Horena'

References

BSI Cultivar Registry Retrieved 11 October 2009

horrida
Endemic flora of Brazil
Flora of the Atlantic Forest
Garden plants of South America